Podostroma is a genus of fungi in the family Hypocreaceae. It was circumscribed by the Finnish mycologist Petter Karsten in 1892. The genus contains 11 species that collectively have a widespread distribution. A large number of these are highly toxic, and should not be handled.

Species
 P. africanum
 P. alutaceum
 P. brevipes
 P. cordyceps
 P. cornu-damae
 P. daisenense
 P. eperuae
 P. giganteum
 P. grossum
 P. solmsii
 P. zeylanicum

References

External links

Hypocreales genera
Hypocreaceae
Taxa named by Petter Adolf Karsten
Taxa described in 1892